Martin Coles Harman (1885 – 5 December 1954) was an English businessman who, in 1925, bought the island of Lundy and proclaimed himself King.

Born in Steyning in Sussex and educated at Whitgift School in Croydon, Harman had six brothers and five sisters. At the age of 16, he left school to work for Lazard, and became an influential figure in early 20th-century corporate finance in the City of London. In 1913, he married Amy Ruth Harman, and, in June 1919, Mr Harman moved to Chaldon, Surrey, where he lived with his wife and their four children. In 1926, he donated land he owned in the village to the National Trust which was subsequently named "Six Brothers Field" at his request.

Harman bought Lundy island and its supply boat the MV Lerina in 1925 for £25,000. In 1927, the GPO ended postal services to the island. For the next two years, Harman handled, and covered the costs of all the island's postage himself. On 1 November 1929, Harman introduced his own "Puffin" stamps to offset this cost. One Puffin is equivalent to one English penny, and printing of the stamps continues today covering the cost of shipping to the mainland, and postage in the UK and abroad.He later issued an independent Lundy currency of half Puffin and one Puffin coins, which were nominally equivalent to the British halfpenny and penny. This resulted in his prosecution by UK authorities for issuing illegal coinage under the Coinage Act of 1870. He was found guilty in 1931, and was fined £5 with fifteen guineas (£15 15s) expenses. The coins were withdrawn and have since become collectors' items.

In 1928, Harman established the Lundy pony.

By 1928, Harman controlled a portfolio of companies worth an estimated £12 million. However, in 1931, his wife Amy died of kidney failure aged 47, and one year later Harman was declared bankrupt. As Lundy had been held in trust, Harman was able to keep his ownership of the island despite his bankruptcy. In November 1933, Harman was found guilty on charges of conspiracy to defraud in connection with a Korean syndicate, and was sentenced to 18 months in prison.

Harman's son, John Pennington Harman was awarded a posthumous Victoria Cross in Kohima, India in 1944. There is a memorial to him at the "VC Quarry" on the east side of Lundy.

References

Bibliography

Notes 

1885 births
1954 deaths
People educated at Whitgift School
Heads of state of states with limited recognition
Lundy
Self-proclaimed monarchy
20th-century English businesspeople